Heliconia rostrata, the hanging lobster claw or false bird of paradise, is a herbaceous perennial plant native to El Salvador, Peru, Bolivia, Colombia, Venezuela, Costa Rica, and Ecuador, and naturalized in Puerto Rico. Other heliconias grow in an upright position (e.g. Heliconia bihai), their cup-shaped flower bracts storing water for birds and insects. This plant, however, has downward-facing flowers, the flowers thus providing a source of nectar to birds.

Heliconias are known to those who grow them as a host flower to many birds, especially the hummingbirds. Because of its unique characteristics, it is often used as a specimen for tropical gardens.

Along with the Kantuta flower, Heliconia rostrata, known as patujú, is the national flower of Bolivia.

Gallery

References

External links
 Heliconia rostrata observations on iNaturalist

rostrata
Flora of Bolivia
Flora of Peru
Flora of Colombia
Flora of Puerto Rico
Flora of Ecuador
Garden plants
Plants described in 1802
National symbols of Bolivia
Flora without expected TNC conservation status